Heather Davis (born 26 February 1974 in Vancouver) is a Canadian rower.

References 
 
 

Living people
Canadian female rowers
Rowers from Vancouver
Rowers at the 2000 Summer Olympics
Olympic bronze medalists for Canada
Olympic rowers of Canada
Olympic medalists in rowing
1974 births

World Rowing Championships medalists for Canada
Medalists at the 2000 Summer Olympics
21st-century Canadian women